Maijana is a monotypic genus of  araneomorph spiders in the family Tetrablemmidae containing the single species, Maijana rackae. It was first described by Pekka T. Lehtinen in 1981 from a single female found in bat guano in a Javanese cave of the Bogor Regency. Though it looks similar to Tetrablemma species, the structural parts, namely the epigyne, are unique enough to differentiate them.

See also
 List of Tetrablemmidae species
Tetrablemma

References

Monotypic Araneomorphae genera
Spiders of Asia
Taxa named by Pekka T. Lehtinen
Tetrablemmidae